The John Day Company was a New York publishing firm that specialized in illustrated fiction and current affairs books and pamphlets from 1926 to 1968. It was founded by Richard J. Walsh in 1926 and named after John Day, the Elizabethan printer. Walsh was the editor and second husband of Pearl S. Buck. The John Day Company was sold to the Thomas Y. Crowell Co. in 1974.

Authors
Some of the many authors associated with John Day Publishing.

 Chinua Achebe
 Irving Adler 
 Peggy Adler
 Scott Buchanan
 Pearl S. Buck 
 James Burnham
 Buwei Yang Chao
 Stuart Chase
 Peter Drucker
 Albert Einstein
 Langston Hughes 
 Sidney Hook
 Jawaharlal Nehru
 Patrick O'Brian
 Franklin D. Roosevelt
 Joseph Stalin
 Leon Trotsky
 Rexford Guy Tugwell
 Lin Yutang

Pamphlet Series

The Great Depression led to a steep decline in book sales in the early 1930s, this led to a small revival in pamphlet literature.  Between 1932 and 1934 the John Day Company published a pamphlet series known as The John Day Pamphlet Series.  In total, 45 were published.  They are as follows:

 Rebecca West, Arnold Bennett Himself 
 Stuart Chase, Out of the Depression—and After: A Prophecy 
 Joseph Vissarionovich Stalin, The New Russian Policy: June 23, 1931 
 Norman Edwin Himes, The Truth about Birth Control: With a Bibliography of Birth Control Literature 
 Walter Lippmann, Notes on the Crisis 
 Charles Austin Beard, The Myth of Rugged American Individualism 
 Rexford Guy Tugwell, Mr. Hoover's Economic Policy 
 Herman Hagedorn, The three pharaohs: a dramatic poem 
 Marion Hawthorne Hedges, A Strikeless Industry: A Review of the National Council on Industrial Relations for the Electrical Construction Industry 
 Gilbert Seldes, Against Revolution 
 George Sylvester Counts, Dare the School Build a New Social Order? (Special, 56 pages) 
 Hendrik Willem Van Loon, To Have or to Be—Take Your Choice 
 Norman Thomas, The Socialist Cure for a Sick Society 
 Herbert George Wells, What Should be Done—Now: A Memorandum on the World Situation 
 Victor Francis Calverton, For Revolution 
 Horace Meyer Kallen, College Prolongs Infancy 
 Richard Bartlett Gregg, Gandhiism versus Socialism 
 Pearl Sydenstricker Buck, Is There a Case for Foreign Missions? 
 Stuart Chase, Technocracy: An Interpretation 
 Albert Einstein, The Fight Against War. Edited by Alfred Lief. (Special, 64 pages) 
 Arthur Gordon Melvin, Education for a New Era: a Call to Leadership 
 John Strachey, Unstable Money 
 Ambrose William Benkert and Earl Harding, How to Restore Values: The Quick, Safe Way Out of the Depression 
 Everett Ross Clinchy, The Strange Case of Herr Hitler 
 Walter Lippmann, A New Social Order 
 Elwyn Brooks White, Alice Through the Cellophane 
 Osgood Nichols and Comstock Glaser, Work Camps for America 
 Louis Morton Hacker, The Farmer is Doomed 
 Archibald MacLeish, Frescoes for Mr. Rockefeller's City 
 Committee of the Progressive Education Association on Social and Economic Problems, A Call to the Teachers of the Nation 
 Henry Hazlitt, Instead of Dictatorship 
 Stuart Chase, The Promise of Power 
 Matthew Josephson, Nazi Culture: The Brown Darkness Over Germany 
 Maurice Finkelstein, The Dilemma of the Supreme Court: Is the N.R.A. Constitutional? 
 Leon Trotsky, What Hitler Wants 
 Audacity! More Audacity! Always Audacity!, Published in Cooperation with The United Action Campaign Committee 
 Harold Rugg and Marvin Krueger, Study Guide to National Recovery: An Introduction to Economic Problems 
 Bertram David Wolfe, Marx and America 
 Marquis William Childs, Sweden: Where Capitalism is Controlled 
 Sir Arthur Salter, Toward a Planned Economy 
 Edward Albert Filene, The Consumer's Dollar 
 Rev. John Haynes Holmes, Is Suicide Justifiable? 
 Mary Catherine Philips and Frederick John Schlink, Discovering Consumers 
 James Rorty, Order on the Air! 
 Stuart Chase, Move the Goods! 

The last page of pamphlet 45 is currently visible on HathiTrust, listing all pamphlets in order.

Other book series
 Creative Music Series
 The Daughters of Valor Series
 Finding Out About Geography
 Finding Out About Science
 Great Men of Science
 Here's How Series
 Let's Visit series
 The Living Drama Series (Series editor: William Kozlenko)
 John Day Books in Contemporary Education
 The John Day Intimate Guide Series
 The New York Times Survey Series
 Our Neighbors series
 Picture Aids to World Geography
 The Reason Why Series
 Scientists at Work Series
 The World of Architecture
 The Young Historian Series (Series editor: Patrick Moore)
 The Your Fair Land Series

References 

Publishing companies established in 1926
Book publishing companies based in New York (state)
Book publishing companies of the United States